The Story was an early 1990s American folk-rock duo composed of Jonatha Brooke and Jennifer Kimball.

History
Jonatha Brooke and Jennifer Kimball first met in 1981 while first-year students at Amherst College in Amherst, Massachusetts. Originally called simply "Jonatha and Jennifer", they performed regularly throughout the Boston area until graduation, at which time Brooke started working in a dance company and Kimball went to a publishing firm. 

In 1989 the duo recorded a demo, Over Oceans, and were quickly signed by Green Linnet Records. They changed their name to The Story, and their debut album Grace in Gravity was released in 1991. Elektra Records then signed the band, reissuing the album a year later. The Angel in the House followed in 1993, but a year later The Story dissolved.

Known for their ethereal and dissonant vocal harmonies, both Brooke and Kimball have gone on to critically acclaimed solo careers. Although The Story's work has been highly regarded by critics and fans alike, both Brooke and Kimball have individually downplayed the band's work.

Discography
 1991 Grace in Gravity
 1993 The Angel in the House

References

American folk rock groups
American musical duos
Musical groups established in 1989
Musical groups disestablished in 1994
Musical groups from Boston
Elektra Records artists
Feminist musicians